Intuit is the debut studio album by Ramona Falls, the moniker of Brent Knopf, better known for being one third of the band Menomena. It was released on August 18, 2009, on Barsuk Records.

It was written and performed by Knopf, with guest appearances by 35 friends (including members of The Helio Sequence, Mirah, Loch Lomond, 31 Knots, Talkdemonic, Nice Nice, Tracker, Dat'r, Dear Reader, 3 Leg Torso, and Matt Sheehy). The cover was illustrated by Theo Ellsworth.

Track listing

Melectric – 4:16
I Say Fever - 4:27
Clover - 5:22
Russia - 3:14
Going Once, Going Twice - 5:41
Salt Sack - 3:55
Boy Ant - 0:52
Always Right - 4:53
The Darkest Day - 4:12
Bellyfulla - 3:36
Diamond Shovel - 3:29

Recording Process
Knopf recorded and mixed the album in both Portland and New York City, using places like The Whimsy Room, The Organ House, The Knitting Factory, Mouse Forest Studio, alongside churches, friends homes and practice rooms. In an interview with Come On Chemicals, Knopf stated about the process:

The result on record was a truly collaborative effort, where each individual would bring their own interpretation. "The whole idea for asking people to come up with ideas is to try and create a space for happy accidents, and then to have those takes be amongst the takes to choose from when assembling composite tracks. So I’d say probably 20 percent was stuff that they had improvised, and 80 percent was stuff I knew I wanted, but they would often play off each other in ways I didn’t predict, so that was pretty cool. But for the most part I had a vision, I had a preconceived notion of what I wanted, but I also wanted to create a space for freedom, for some improvisation and some mistakes, because often in mistakes is where the best ideas are."

Personnel
Brent Knopf -  recording and mixing (tracks 1–10)
Jeff Stuart Saltzman - recording and mixing (track 11)
Alan Douches - mastering

References

Ramona Falls (band) albums
2009 debut albums